Bavarisauridae is an extinct family of basal squamates found in the Solnhofen limestone near Bavaria, Germany. Two genera are recognized: Bavarisaurus and Schoenesmahl. Up until 2017, Bavarisaurus was the only genus in the family, and it might be the only true bavarisaurid since Schoenesmahl might have instead been part of the Eichstaettisauridae.

References 

Solnhofen fauna
Jurassic lizards
Scincogekkonomorpha